Alexandru Ștefan Sătmăreanu (born 9 March 1952) is a Romanian former footballer who played as a defender.

Club career
Born in Oradea, Alexandru Sătmăreanu started his career in his hometown at Crișul, making his Divizia A debut on 21 September 1969 in a 2–1 away victory against ASA Târgu Mureș, the team relegating at the end of that season in Divizia B, but he stayed with the club, helping it promote back to the first division after only one season in which he played 29 matches and scored 7 goals. The following went to play for Dinamo București, helping the team win three league titles in 1973, 1975 and 1977, in the first he played 16 matches without scoring, in the second he appeared in 29 games and scored 3 goals and in the third he made 34 appearances in which he scored 5 goals. In 1979, after playing for Dinamo in a UEFA Cup match against Eintracht Frankfurt, he remained in Frankfurt illegally and signed with VfB Stuttgart, at that time during Romania's communist regime, running away from the country was not allowed. He made his Bundesliga debut on 17 January 1981 under coach Jürgen Sundermann in a 2–1 away victory against Nürnberg, having a total of 12 appearances and two goals scored against Bayer Uerdingen and Borussia Dortmund in his first season, helping the team finish on the 3rd position, but after two seasons, Sătmăreanu went to play in the United States at the North American Soccer League team Fort Lauderdale Strikers where he was known under the name Alexander Szatmar. Sătmăreanu has a total of 32 matches and three goals scored in Bundesliga, 223 matches and 18 goals scored in Divizia A and 22 games appearances with 2 goals scored in European competitions. After he ended his playing career, Alexandru Sătmăreanu had several businesses in Germany and Luxembourg, also being coach and president at Eintracht Trier and president at Bihor Oradea.

International career
Alexandru Sătmăreanu played 28 games at international level for the Romania national team, making his debut on 23 July 1974 when coach Valentin Stănescu introduced him at half-time to replace Cornel Dinu in a friendly which ended with a 4–1 victory against Japan. He played six games at the Euro 1976 qualifiers and four at the 1978 World Cup qualifiers. Sătmăreanu also played two games at the 1973–76 Balkan Cup and three at the successful 1977–80 Balkan Cup.

Honours
Crișul Oradea
Divizia B: 1970–71
Dinamo București
Divizia A: 1972–73, 1974–75, 1976–77
Trofeo Costa de Valencia: 1978
Romania
Balkan Cup: 1977–80, runner-up 1973–76

Notes

References

External links
Fort Lauderdale Strikers stats

1952 births
Living people
Sportspeople from Oradea
Romanian footballers
Association football defenders
Romania international footballers
Olympic footballers of Romania
Liga I players
Liga II players
FC Bihor Oradea players
FC Dinamo București players
VfB Stuttgart players
FSV Salmrohr players
Fort Lauderdale Strikers (1977–1983) players
North American Soccer League (1968–1984) players
North American Soccer League (1968–1984) indoor players
Bundesliga players
Romanian football managers
Romanian defectors
Romanian expatriate footballers
Romanian expatriate football managers
Romanian expatriate sportspeople in Germany
Expatriate footballers in Germany
Expatriate football managers in Germany
Romanian expatriate sportspeople in the United States
Expatriate soccer players in the United States